The Regnitz is a river in Franconia, Germany.

The river is formed by the confluence of the rivers Rednitz and Pegnitz, which meet in the city of Fürth. From there the Regnitz runs northwards through the cities of Erlangen and Forchheim. It finally meets the Main near the city of Bamberg.

Small portions of the Regnitz near Bamberg are incorporated into a canal connecting the Main with the Danube: the Rhine-Main-Danube Canal, which otherwise runs parallel from Bamberg to Fürth.

Between Fürth and Forchheim many norias for drawing water up were used from the Middle Ages until the 19th century. Some are still there or were reconstructed.

The origin of the name is uncertain. The first written evidence of the name refers to a large farm on the river. It is first mentioned in a Latin document from 1160 as Rekinzi. It may be based on Slavic Rakonica ('crab river').

Sources 
Bogner, Franz X. (2007): Rednitz und Regnitz. Eine Luftbildreise von Weißenburg bis Bamberg. Verlag Fränkischer Tag, Bamberg,

References

 
Rivers of Bavaria
Federal waterways in Germany
Erlangen-Höchstadt
Forchheim (district)
Bamberg (district)
Rivers of Germany